Capiz's 3rd congressional district was one of the three congressional districts of the Philippines in the province of Capiz in existence between 1907 and 1957. It was created under the Philippine Organic Act from former territories of the province. The district was composed of the municipalities of Buruanga, Ibajay, Malinao, Nabas and Taft in what is now the province of Aklan, and the municipalities of Badajoz, Cajidiocan, Looc, Odiongan, Romblon and San Fernando which now constitute the island province of Romblon. It was a single-member district throughout the ten legislatures of the Insular Government of the Philippine Islands from 1907 to 1935, the three legislatures of the Commonwealth of the Philippines from 1935 to 1946, and the first three congresses of the Third Philippine Republic from 1946 to 1947.

The district was represented by a total of fourteen representatives throughout its existence. In 1917, following the re-establishment of the province of Romblon, Capiz was redistricted, leaving the third district with only the municipalities in western Aklan including Calivo. The district was abolished in 1957 following the passage of Republic Act No. 1414 which created the province of Aklan.

It was last represented by Godofredo P. Ramos of the Nacionalista Party (NP).

Representation history

See also
Legislative districts of Capiz

References

Former congressional districts of the Philippines
Politics of Capiz
History of Aklan
History of Romblon
1907 establishments in the Philippines
1957 disestablishments in the Philippines
Congressional districts of Western Visayas
Constituencies established in 1907
Constituencies disestablished in 1956